The Olympic Adventures of Fuwa is a Chinese animation portraying the 2008 Summer Olympics mascots, known as the Fuwa. The series began running on 8 August 2007. Prior to the television release, Kaku TV distributed copies of the series to foreign embassies and cities.

The series, produced by Kaku TV and China Beijing TV Station, aired on China Beijing TV Station and over 100 other Chinese television channels.

Creators from Mainland China and Hong Kong collaborated to produce the series.

The Asian Animation Comics Contest awarded the series "Best Production" in September 2007.

Cast

Episodes

01 "Fuwa Has Stupidly Arrived"
02 "The Mysterious Starting Blocks"
03 "Sprint Crazy"
04 "The Special Champion"
05 "The Unexpected Origin"
06 "The Statue with a Title"
07 "Boxing World"
08 "Freedom is the Fastest"
09 "Target Shooting"
10 "The Beach and the Volleyball"
11 "Waterlilies"
12 "More Styles of Swimming"
13 "Sword Skills"
14 "Tennis is Fun"
15 "Bicycle Kingdom"
16 "The Borrowed Champion"
17 "The Secret of the Bow and Arrow"
18 "Archery Heroes"
19 "Which is the Fastest Ball?"
20 "High Jumping Without Limits"
21 "Run Greeks Run!"
22 "The Strange Series of a Competition"
23 "Missing Marathon Man"
24 "The Queen and the Fast Runner"
25 "Childhood Inspiration"
26 "Snow Per Hour"
27 "Shaving Heads After a Lost"
28 "The Unlikely Horse"
29 "Dancing in the Air"
30 "Secrets of Ice Hockeys"
31 "Child's Game"
32 "Flying Trapeze"
33 "0.1 Central - Winning Away"
34 "The First Sword"
35 "Ice Ballet"
36 "The Different Medal"
37 "Failure is the Mother of Success"
38 "Shot of the Evolution"
39 "The Frog is My Teacher"
40 "The Sport That is Cool and Refreshing"
41 "Multi-Platform Synchronized Diving"
42 "Beach-goers"
43 "Secrets of the Swimsuit"
44 "Snowy Battlefields"
45 "Overcoming Obstacles"
46 "The Price of Excitement"
47 "Step by Step to Becoming the Champion"
48 "The General Feeling of Flying"
49 "Absolute Balance"
50 "Hercules of War"
51 "Guess About the Olympics"
52 "Immortal Flame"
53 "The Boxer on the Sled"
54 "The Birth of Football"
55 "The Star of the Pitch"
56 "The Professor's Game"
57 "The Dream Team"
58 "Handballing with No Fouls"
59 "Hockey in the Tang Dynasty"
60 "The Unexpected Competition"
61 "Table Tennis"
62 "Ping-Pong in China"
63 "Flying Over the Basketball Net"
64 "The Female Superstar of Volleyball"
65 "Champion Mom"
66 "A Good Horse's Race"
67 "The Super Warrior's Song"
68 "The Fuwa vs. the Professor"
69 "The Prince of Gymnastics"
70 "Steel Wires and Horizontal Bars"
71 "Tricks on the Parallel Bars"
72 "Ups and Downs"
73 "Swings and Rings"
74 "The Somersaulting Sport"
75 "The Gold Medal Within the Gold Medal"
76 "Pole Vaulting"
77 "Heavy Mali ELE surur eya ala a hra a o do o you di mie"
78 "The Champion Across the Towel"
79 "Who is the Strongest?"
80 "Wrestling"
81 "The Road to Judo"
82 "The Technique"
83 "Taekwondo Training Class"
84 "This is How to Make Steel"
85 "Water Heroes"
86 "In the Rush"
87 "The Champion Without a Name"
88 "Victorious"
89 "Uncharted Waters"
90 "Zonda"
91 "18 Martial Arts"
92 "Chinese Kung Fu"
93 "China's Pride"
94 "The Chapter of Brilliance"
95 "Iron Champion"
96 "Running with Tennis"
97 "There's a Judo Master in the Massage Room"
98 "The Circle of Smiles"
99 "Half Gold Half Silver"
100 "Beijing Welcomes You"

References

External links
 The successful 'Olympic Adventures of Fuwa'
 

2008 Summer Olympics
2007 Chinese television series debuts
2007 Chinese television series endings
2000s animated comedy television series
Chinese animated television series
Chinese sports television series
Mandarin-language television shows
2007 anime television series debuts